Pavlos Bakoyannis (February 10, 1935 in Velota, Evrytania – September 26, 1989 in Athens) was a liberal Greek politician who was well known for his broadcasts against the Greek military junta of 1967–1974 on Bayerischer Rundfunk radio. He was shot and killed in the front entrance of his office in 1989 by members of the terrorist group Revolutionary Organization 17 November.

Biography
Bakoyannis was a member of the New Democracy party, for which, at the time of his murder, he was parliamentary leader in the Hellenic Parliament.

He was married to Dora Bakoyannis, daughter of Constantine Mitsotakis. After the murder of Pavlos, she passed a law prohibiting the publication of terrorist groups' post-attack manifestos in Greek newspapers. Dora Bakoyannis has since claimed that the bill was a mistake, and did not attempt to re-establish it after its repeal in 1993.

Dimitris Koufodinas, Iraklis Kostaris and Alexandros Giotopoulos were sentenced to life imprisonment for the murder by an Athens court in December 2003. Savvas Xiros and Vassilis Tzortzatos both received 18-year sentences for the murder.

Venizelos/Mitsotakis family tree

References

External links
 "Tür zu" Article for the persecuted by the Greek military junta of 1967-1974 Pavlos Bakoyannis and Dimitris Soulas. Der Spiegel, 1968-09-23.

1935 births
1989 murders in Greece
1989 deaths
Assassinated Greek politicians
Deaths by firearm in Greece
Greek MPs 1989 (June–November)
Victims of the Revolutionary Organization 17 November
Greek terrorism victims
Terrorism deaths in Greece
People murdered in Greece
Mitsotakis family
People from Evrytania